Gol Sarak (also known as Gol Sarak-e Sarāvān) is a village in Saravan Rural District, Sangar District, Rasht County, Gilan Province, Iran. At the 2006 census, its population was 1,782, in 469 families.

References 

Populated places in Rasht County